The London Sevens is an annual rugby sevens tournament held at Twickenham Stadium in London. It is part of the World Rugby Sevens Series. 
London was added to the World Series for the first time in 2001. For many years the London Sevens was the last tournament of each season but the Paris Sevens became the last stop on the calendar in 2018. 
The current titleholder of the London Sevens are Australia, who beat New Zealand in the 2022 final.

The London Sevens is one of the more popular stops on the World Series. The 2011 London Sevens set a single-day attendance record of over 54,000 fans, surpassing the attendance record set by the Dubai Sevens. The tournament has also drawn over 100,000 fans over the course of the weekend, making it one of the largest attended recurring events on the Twickenham stadium calendar.

2013 qualifier
Uniquely, the 2013 edition was not only the final event in the series, but also incorporated the World Series Core Team Qualifier. In Sevens Series terminology, "core teams" are those that are guaranteed a place in all series events in a given season. Unlike all other series events, the 2013 London Sevens had only 12 teams competing for series points, namely the top 12 core teams on the season points table following the  season's penultimate tournament, the Scotland Sevens. The Core Team Qualifier involved eight teams—the winner of the HSBC Asian Sevens Series; four teams advancing from the World Series Pre-Qualifier, held as part of the Hong Kong Sevens; and the three core teams at the bottom of the season table after the Scotland Sevens. The top three teams at the end of the Core Team Qualifier became core teams for the next season.

World Rugby, then known as the International Rugby Board, chose to change its core team qualifying process in advance of the 2013–14 series, reducing the number of promotion/relegation places from three to one, and also using only the Hong Kong Sevens for the core team qualifier. Accordingly, the London Sevens returned to its traditional 16-team format from 2014 forward.

Results by year

Multiple winners
The teams that have won the tournament, as part of the World Rugby Sevens Series, on multiple occasions are:

See also
 London Women's Sevens — This event was held in 2012, 2013, and 2015.

References

External links 
London Sevens Profile on UR7s.com
London Sevens

 
World Rugby Sevens Series tournaments
Recurring sporting events established in 2001
2001 establishments in England
Sevens
Rugby sevens competitions in England
International sports competitions in London